A ski route is a signed but unpisted and otherwise unmanaged downhill ski run.

As a rule, ski routes allow off-piste skiing in deep powder snow without significant risk from avalanches or natural obstacles. Ski routes may also include mogul routes. As well as being unprepared, ski routes  generally follow a challenging course.

!
Ski mountaineering